Darrell Bruce Irvin (born January 21, 1957) is a former National Football League player who played four seasons in the National Football League (NFL). He played 3 years with the Buffalo Bills (1980–1982) and one year with Seattle Seahawks (1983) as a Defensive End. He played college football at Northeastern Oklahoma A&M Junior College and the University of Oklahoma and attended Pawhuska High School in Pawhuska, Oklahoma.

References 

Darrell Bruce Irvin www.profootballarchives.com. Retrieved March 24, 2018

External links 
Darrell Irvin at NFL.com

1957 births
American football defensive ends
Buffalo Bills players
Living people
Oklahoma Sooners football players
People from Pawhuska, Oklahoma
Players of American football from Oklahoma
Seattle Seahawks players